Lugger Glacier is a broad glacier,  long, which occupies the upland northward of Mount Bergen and Mount Gran in the Convoy Range, and flows north to the head of Alatna Valley. It was named by the New Zealand Geographic Board around 1980 in association with the names of ships grouped in the Convoy Range; a lugger being a small vessel with four-sided sails.

References

Glaciers of Victoria Land